{{DISPLAYTITLE:C15H25NO3}}
The molecular formula C15H25NO3 (molar mass: 267.36 g/mol, exact mass: 267.183444) may refer to:

 Butaxamine
 Desacetylmetipranolol
 EEE (psychedelic)
 Metoprolol

Molecular formulas